Johan Robert "Joop" Carp (30 January 1897 in Tjomal, Dutch East Indies – 25 March 1962 in Johannesburg) was a sailor from the Netherlands, who represented his native country at the 1920 Summer Olympics in Ostend, Belgium. With crew Bernard Carp and Petrus Wernink, helming Dutch boat Oranje, Carp took the Gold in the 6.5 Metre. In the 1924 Olympics Carp took part of the competition in the 6 Metre with the Dutch boat Willem Six with crew members Anthonij Guépin and Jan Vreede Carp took this time the bronze medal. In the 1936 Olympics Carp returned to the Olympics as helmsman of the Dutch 6 Metre De Ruyter this time with crew members Ansco Dokkum, Kees Jonker, Herman Looman, Ernst Moltzer and finished eighth overall.

Professional life
Joop Carp studied law at the Leiden University. He graduated in 1921. Shortly after that he became vice-president of Fokker Aircraft. Here he was involved in the development of the first large commercial aircraft.

Later Carp became more involved with the exploitation of important inventions like the  'Oertz-rudder', de 'Frigoplate' en de 'Frost-O-Matic Ice Cream Vending Machine'. In 1926 he opened his own office in New York City. Later he emigrated to South Africa.

Personal life
Carp married, and divorced, Johanna Sybille Hall who was also an Olympic athlete in Dressage during the Olympic Games of 1960, 1964 and 1968.

References

Sources

External links
 
 
 

1897 births
1962 deaths
People from Pemalang Regency
Leiden University alumni
Dutch male sailors (sport)
Sailors at the 1920 Summer Olympics – 6.5 Metre
Sailors at the 1924 Summer Olympics – 6 Metre
Sailors at the 1936 Summer Olympics – 6 Metre
Olympic sailors of the Netherlands
Medalists at the 1920 Summer Olympics
Medalists at the 1924 Summer Olympics
Olympic medalists in sailing
Olympic gold medalists for the Netherlands
Olympic bronze medalists for the Netherlands
Dutch emigrants to South Africa
Dutch people of the Dutch East Indies